Elizabeth Ruby Miller (née Shank) (August 24, 1905 – December 31, 1988) was an American housewife and politician.

Born in Marshalltown, Iowa, Miller graduated from Marshalltown High School. She married John Bascom Miller in 1923 and was a housewife. From 1969 to 1973, Miller served in the Iowa House of Representatives and was a Republican. Then Miller served in the Iowa State Senate from 1971 to 1979. Miller died of a heart attack at her home in Marshalltown, Iowa.

Notes

1905 births
1988 deaths
Politicians from Marshalltown, Iowa
Women state legislators in Iowa
Members of the Iowa House of Representatives
Iowa state senators
20th-century American women politicians
20th-century American politicians